Ingeborg of Sweden (1263–1292), was a Swedish Princess and Countess consort of Holstein-Plön by marriage to Gerhard II, Count of Holstein-Plön. She was the daughter of Valdemar, King of Sweden, and Sophia of Denmark.

Marriage
Ingeborg married on 12 December 1275 Gerhard II, Count of Holstein-Plön. The couple had four children:
 Catherine ( - before 1300)
 Gerhard IV (1277-1312), Count of Holstein-Plön
 Valdemar ( - 29 July 1306), Count of Holstein-Schauenburg, died after the Second Battle of Uetersen
 Elizabeth ( - 20 July 1318 or 1319), married Otto I, Duke of Pomerania

References 

1292 deaths
Swedish princesses
1263 births
House of Bjelbo
House of Schauenburg
13th-century Swedish people
13th-century Swedish women
Daughters of kings